K. R. Ramasamy (or Ramaswamy) may refer to:
 K. R. Ramasamy (politician), Member of the Legislative Assembly (MLA) of Indian National Congress (INC) Party
 K. R. Ramasamy (actor), Indian actor and founding member of DMK Party
 K. R. Ramaswamy, popularly known as Traffic Ramaswamy, social activist